The Montgomery may refer to one of the following buildings:

The Montgomery (Chicago) in Illinois, United States
The Montgomery (San Francisco) in California, United States

See also
Montgomery (disambiguation)